The Avant Independent School District is a school district based in Avant, Oklahoma United States. It contains a single school that serves Kindergarten-Grade 8.

See also
List of school districts in Oklahoma

References

External links
 Avant Overview
 Avant Public School

School districts in Oklahoma
Education in Osage County, Oklahoma